Senator Soto may refer to:

Danny López Soto (1944–2011), Senate of Puerto Rico
José Tous Soto (1874–1933), Senate of Puerto Rico
Lornna Soto (born 1970), Senate of Puerto Rico
Miguel Deynes Soto (born 1936), Senate of Puerto Rico
Nell Soto (1926–2009), California State Senate